Bang Rak Phatthana is one of the eight subdistricts (tambon) of Bang Bua Thong District, in Nonthaburi Province, Thailand. Neighbouring subdistricts are (clockwise from north) Phimon Rat, Om Kret, Bang Rak Noi, Bang Rak Yai, Sao Thong Hin, Bang Mae Nang and Bang Khu Rat. In 2020 it had a total population of 73,369 people.

Administration

Central administration
The subdistrict is subdivided into 15 administrative villages (muban).

Local administration
The area of the subdistrict is shared by two local administrative organizations.
Bang Rak Phatthana Town Municipality
Bang Bua Thong Town Municipality

References

External links
Website of Bang Rak Phatthana Town Municipality
Website of Bang Bua Thong Town Municipality

Tambon of Nonthaburi province
Populated places in Nonthaburi province